Roberto Ferrari (born 9 March 1983) is an Italian former professional cyclist, who competed professionally between 2007 and 2019 for the Tenax, and  teams.

Career
Ferrari was born in Gavardo. After stage 3 of the 2012 Giro d'Italia in Horsens, Denmark, Ferrari was relegated from 10th to 192nd position after the race jury ruled that he was responsible for a crash that brought down world champion Mark Cavendish and race leader Taylor Phinney since he swerved from the left to the right side of the road in the final meters. He stated after that mishap that "I don't care what is going on behind me". He gained extensive disapproval with this statement, from within the professional peloton and from the public. Ferrari later won stage 11 – the longest stage of the race – in a sprint finish in Montecatini Terme.

Major results

2004
 9th Trofeo Franco Balestra
2005
 6th Circuito del Porto
 8th Trofeo Città di Brescia
2006
 1st GP Città di Felino
 1st Trofeo Città di Brescia
 1st Stage 2 Giro della Regione Friuli Venezia Giulia
 4th Trofeo Gianfranco Bianchin
 8th Trofeo Franco Balestra
2008
 1st Prologue Tour Ivoirien de la Paix
 4th Gran Premio della Costa Etruschi
2009
 1st Memorial Marco Pantani
 4th Grand Prix de Denain
2010
 1st Gran Premio di Lugano
 1st Giro del Friuli
 1st Stage 5 Brixia Tour
 5th Gran Premio Industria e Commercio Artigianato Carnaghese
 5th Gran Premio Nobili Rubinetterie
 10th GP Industria & Artigianato di Larciano
2011
 Tour de San Luis
1st Stages 1 & 3
 1st Stage 1b (TTT) Settimana Internazionale di Coppi e Bartali
 2nd Gran Premio della Costa Etruschi
2012
 1st Route Adélie
 1st Flèche d'Emeraude
 1st Stage 11 Giro d'Italia
 4th Coppa Bernocchi
 6th Overall Tour de Taiwan
1st Stage 5
2013
 2nd Coppa Bernocchi
2015
 3rd Gran Premio Bruno Beghelli
2016
 3rd Gran Premio di Lugano

Grand Tour general classification results timeline

References

External links

Roberto Ferrari's profile on Cycling Base

Italian male cyclists
Living people
1983 births
Italian Giro d'Italia stage winners
Cyclists from the Province of Brescia